"Laserlight" is a song by English singer-songwriter Jessie J featuring French DJ David Guetta, taken from the 
platinum edition of Jessie J's debut studio album, Who You Are. The artists co-wrote the song with The Invisible Men, Giorgio Tuinfort, and Frédéric Riesterer. The song was released on 13 May 2012 in the United Kingdom, as the seventh overall and final single from the album. Ahead of its official release, "Laserlight" became Jessie J's sixth top 10 hit in the UK – peaking at number five – making her the first British female to have six top 10 singles from one album.

Background and composition

The song was written by Jessie J, The Invisible Men, David Guetta, Giorgio Tuinfort and Frédéric Riesterer and produced by Guetta, Tuinfort and Riesterer. After Jessie provided guest vocals on Guetta's track "Repeat", he offered to return the favour, and as such, the pair wrote "Laserlight" for the platinum edition of Jessie's debut studio album, "Who You Are". Jessie describes "Laserlight" as an upbeat, shimmering Eurodance and house song, that features the lyrics, "You make me feel good, you make me feel safe, you make me feel like I could live another day." The release of "Laserlight" as a single was confirmed by Jessie on 17 February 2012, during an interview on BBC Radio 1. During the interview, she claimed that the music video for "Laserlight" would be filmed during the first week of March. The video was released on 10 April.

According to the sheet music published at Musicnotes.com, "Laserlight" is written in the key of B major with a tempo of 127 beats per minute.  It follows the chord progression B−Dm−Gm−E, and Jessie J's vocals span from F3 to E5.

Reception

Critical response
The song received fairly positive reviews from critics, with critics praising Jessie's powerful vocals and the song's production while criticising its similarity to "Titanium" and the lack of originality in lyrics and theme. The website Idolator wrote that the song is "the clear winner" of the album's new tracks. Pip Elwood from "Entertainment Focus" wrote a positive review, saying that the song "showcases a completely different side of Jessie, with David Guetta’s club beats providing the perfect background for Jessie’s vocals to soar, similar to Guetta's previous productions with Kelly Rowland's number-one single on the UK Singles Chart, "When Love Takes Over" and with Sia's "Titanium". Digital Spy referred to the song as "a bona-fide chart hit" and gave it four out of five stars.

Chart performance
"Laserlight" charted on the Australian, New Zealand and Romanian singles charts, due to heavy downloads from Who You Are. The track has reached the top-fifty in Australia, top-forty in Romania and top-twenty in New Zealand. In the United Kingdom, the song debuted at number twenty-six on the UK Singles Chart on the chart issue dated 21 April 2012, selling 12,100 copies. The following week the song climbed twenty-one positions to number five with sales of 38,983 copies. "Laserlight" is Jessie J's sixth top-ten single in the UK, thus becoming the first British female to have six top-ten hits from one album (Who You Are).

Music video
During Jessie J's show in Melbourne (7 March 2012) on her worldwide Heartbeat Tour, she announced that the editing on the "Laserlight" video was finished and was ready to be released.

The full music video premiered on Jessie J's VEVO on YouTube, 9 April 2012. David Guetta does not make a cameo appearance in the video. The video is directed by Emil Nava.

Formats and track listings
 Digital download
 "Laserlight" (featuring David Guetta) – 3:32

 Digital download – remix
 "LaserLight" (Daddy's Groove Remix) – 5:07

 CD single
 "Laserlight" (radio edit) – 3:32
 "Laserlight" (Daddy's Groove Remix) – 5:07
 "Laserlight" (extended mix) – 5:26

Credits and personnel
 Jessica Cornish – songwriter, vocals
 The Invisible Men – songwriter, original production, vocal recording
 David Guetta – songwriter, producer, mixing, mastering
 Giorgio Tuinfort – songwriter, producer
 Frederic Riesterer – songwriter, producer
 Tom Coyne – mastering

Credits adapted from Who You Are album liner notes.

Charts

Weekly charts

Year-end charts

Certifications

Release history

References

2012 singles
Jessie J songs
Dance-pop songs
Songs written by David Guetta
Songs written by Jessie J
Songs written by Giorgio Tuinfort
Songs written by Frédéric Riesterer
2011 songs
Universal Republic Records singles
Songs written by Jason Pebworth
Songs written by George Astasio
Songs written by Jon Shave
Lava Records singles
Song recordings produced by David Guetta